Ediacara may refer to:

Places
Ediacara, South Australia, a locality in South Australia
 Ediacara Hills, a range of hills in the northern Flinders Ranges , South Australia
 Nilpena Ediacara National Park, formerly Ediacara Conservation Park, South Australia

Other

 Ediacaria, discoidal fossil animal once thought to be a jellyfish
 The Ediacaran geological time period, named after the Ediacara Hills
 The Ediacaran biota, the oldest known complex multicellular life